The Petrovo Polje ("Peter's Field") is a karstic field in the northern part of Dalmatian Hinterland in Croatia.

Geography 
It slopes from the north-east at 320 m.a.s.l. to its south-western end at 265 m.a.s.l.

Climate 
The climate of Petrovo Polje has the elements of both the cooler and harsher continental climate of the north and the warmer climate predominant in the south. In the winter, jugo and bora winds are common. The average number of frost days per year is 30, between October and April. Summers are dry.

Settlements 
The settlements are situated on the edge of the field: Drniš, Kričke, Ružić, Umljanović, Kljake, Čavoglave, Gradac, Otavice, Kanjane, Parčić, Miočić, Biočić, Tepljuh, Siverić, Badanj. Kadina Glavica is located on the hill with the same name, while Baljci and Mirlović Polje are located above the field, on the slopes of Svilaja.

History and culture 

In the antiquity, Petrovo Polje was known under the name of Campus Illyricum. Its present-day name, first mentioned in the 11th century, is believed to refer to Petar Snačić (or Svačić), the last Croatian king, and his Petrovac castle which he built in the Petrovo Polje's northern edge.

In Otavice, a small village on the edge of Petrovo Polje, there is a Church of the Most Holy Redeemer, which is also the Meštrović family mausoleum, built by the famous Croatian sculptor Ivan Meštrović between 1926 and 1930.

See also 
 Ravni Kotari

References

Bibliography
 

Karst fields
Plains of Croatia
Landforms of Šibenik-Knin County